Pleiomeris canariensis is a species of plant in the family Primulaceae. It is endemic to Canary Islands, Spain.

References

Flora of Spain
Primulaceae
Vulnerable plants
Taxonomy articles created by Polbot